The Snyder Memorial Museum and Creative Arts Center, formerly the Snyder House, at 1620 East Madison Avenue in Bastrop in Morehouse Parish in northern Louisiana, was built in 1929.  It was listed on the National Register of Historic Places on October 18, 1996.  The listing included two contributing buildings.

It was built in 1929 as a one-story brown and beige brick residence for Charles and Esther Snyder, with a tiled roof.  According to its NRHP nomination, "The house is difficult to pigeonhole stylistically because it represents the eclecticism which characterized early twentieth architecture. It borrows from the "English cottage" style in its massing, but certain features give it an Italian or Mediterranean flavor. Although the Snyder House's many gables are not as steeply pitched as is typical of the "English cottage" style, its massing is perhaps best viewed within that tradition's penchant for a picturesque look. There are no less than eight gabled projections: two on the facade, one of which is an entrance porch, three on the eastern side elevation, two on the western side elevation, and a small one on the rear. Add to this a prominent front chimney (a favorite of the "English cottage" style). This "busy" massing and complex footprint belies the house's conventional central hall plan."

See also
National Register of Historic Places listings in Morehouse Parish, Louisiana

References

External links
Snyder Museum, official site

National Register of Historic Places in Louisiana
Tudor Revival architecture in Louisiana
Italianate architecture in Louisiana
Buildings and structures completed in 1929
Museums in Morehouse Parish, Louisiana